Penguin Point lies on the south-eastern coast of Seymour Island, in the James Ross Island group, near the north-eastern extremity of the Antarctic Peninsula.  The Argentine Marambio Base is about 8 km to the north-east. A ridge of exposed dark rock named Blackrock Ridge runs west-southwest–east-northeast, 1.5 nautical miles (3 km) north of Penguin Point.

Important Bird Area
Some 326 ha of sparsely vegetated, ice-free ground, including the point and adjacent cobbled beach, and extending 1260 m inland, has been identified as an Important Bird Area (IBA) by BirdLife International because it supports a large breeding colony of about 16,000 pairs of Adélie penguins.  Weddell and Antarctic fur seals regularly haul out there.

References

Important Bird Areas of Antarctica
Penguin colonies
Headlands of the James Ross Island group